The Paicines AVA is an American Viticultural Area located in San Benito County, California, named after the town of Paicines. It is part of the larger San Benito AVA, and is located near the central part of the county.  The Paicines area is warmer than other nearby regions in San Benito, but cooler than the wine regions of the Central Valley.  The appellation is home to the Vista Verde Vineyard, a  vineyard once owned by Almaden Vineyards.

References

American Viticultural Areas
American Viticultural Areas of California
Geography of San Benito County, California
1982 establishments in California